The 2008 North Korean Census was the second North Korea national census. The reference day used for the census was October 1, 2008. The census was taken by house-to-house interviews by enumerators using a census questionnaire. Roughly 35,000 enumerators were trained to help with the census. The population of North Korea was counted as 24,052,231 a 13.38% increase from the 1993 Census.

The results of the census are thought of as plausible by foreign observers.

The census was widely advertised in propaganda. This resulted in a detailed survey.

The 2008 census is the latest census of North Korea. The next census was scheduled for 2018.

Introduction 
North Korea completed its first census in 1993. In October 2006, a declaration was enacted to complete a second census in 2008. In order to test procedures, in October 2007, there was a pilot census completed across each of the provinces where roughly 50,000 households were counted. The actual census took place from October 1–15, 2008 using October 1, 2008 at 1:00 AM as a reference point.

Questionnaire 
There were several questions asked on the census broken into three modules:

The first module was titled Household and dwelling unit information. There were 14 questions in this module pertaining to the persons' housing unit. If the respondent lived in an institutional living quarter, then the rest of the section was skipped. All of the questions are listed below:

 How many are the members of this household?
 Type of Household
 What is the class of labor of head of this household?
 What is the previous class of labor of head of this household?
 What type of dwelling does this household occupy?
 Does this household have the first right to occupancy of this dwelling unit?
 What is the total floor area of this dwelling unit?
 How many rooms are there in this dwelling unit? (Exclude sitting room, Kitchen)
 Is there a water tap in this dwelling unit?
 What is the source of water supply for your household? 
 What kind of toilet facility does your household have access to?
 What heating system is established in your household?
 What heating system is used by your household?
 Which fuel is used for cooking?

The second module was titled personal information and had the most questions of any of the modules. There was a total of 29 questions to be asked including sex, nationality, school level, marital status, and employment.

The third module was titled mortality. The first question was "Did any member of this household die during the period 1 Oct. 2007 to 30 Sept. 2008?" If the answer was no, the rest of this section was skipped. If the answer was yes, then five additional questions were asked. If the deceased person was a female between 15 and 49, five more additional questions were asked. All ten additional questions are listed below.

 What was/were the name(s) of the household member(s) who died?
 Sex
 When was _ born?
 When did _die?
 How old was __ when he/she died?
 Was pregnant at the time of her death?
 Did ___ die while having abortion or miscarriage or within 42 days of having abortion/miscarriage?
 Did _ die while giving birth or within 42 days of giving birth?
 Where did _die? (Home, Hospital, or Other)
 Did she have a live birth anytime between 1 Oct. 2007 and the time of death? If "Yes", How many male and female children did she give birth at that time?

Rankings

See also

 Demographics of North Korea

Notes

References 
 

Censuses in North Korea
North Korea
Census